Lebogang Ghiba Morula (sometimes spelt Lebohang) (born 22 December 1968 in Brits, North West) is a retired South African football player.

Club career
Morula started his career at Jomo Cosmos in South Africa and moved in 1995 to Colombian club Once Caldas with fellow South African footballer Teboho Moloi in a "pay as you play" contract. He made his debut against Deportes Quindío becoming the first African player to appear in the Categoría Primera A. However, he disliked the contract based on appearances and left the club after playing only 20 minutes.

In 1996, he was brought to Peru by former South Africa manager Augusto Palacios to play for Aurich–Cañaña, ending the season relegated from the 1996 Torneo Descentralizado.

In 1997, Morula returned to Jomo Cosmos, scoring once in the Rothmans Cup against AmaZulu. He joined Turkish club Vanspor in December, playing 16 Süper Lig matches and scoring once against Kocaelispor, but couldn't avoid ending at the bottom at the table and left the club after the end of the season. He returned to Jomo Cosmos as a player-assistant before ending his career in 2001.

International career
Morula acquired Peruvian citizenship by the time he played at Juan Aurich, but opted to play for the South Africa national football team. He appeared once in a friendly match against Iceland and was a member of the squad that travelled to France for the 1998 FIFA World Cup.

Personal life
His son Karol Josep Lebogang Bernal was born in Peru and is a right-back at UCAM Murcia CF, having trained with the Peru national under-20 football team.

Morula was arrested for many crimes such as hijacking, stealing cars generators and electronic goods, ATM robbery, and armed robbery. He was also convicted of malicious damage to property back in 1986 and theft in 2004.

He also faced controversy in his second marriage in 2014 when his bride's mother and two of his sons attempted to stop the wedding stating he was still married to his legal wife, who was on her deathbed. It was also stated that his new wife had a boyfriend and that he struck Morula with a buttstock later in the same night.

References

External links

1968 births
Living people
South African soccer players
1998 FIFA World Cup players
Vanspor footballers
Juan Aurich footballers
Expatriate footballers in Peru
Association football forwards
Association football midfielders
Jomo Cosmos F.C. players
Once Caldas footballers
Expatriate footballers in Colombia
South African expatriate soccer players
South Africa international soccer players
South African expatriate sportspeople in Colombia
South African expatriate sportspeople in Peru